"Children" is an instrumental composition by Italian composer Robert Miles. It was first released in Italy in January 1995 as part of the EP Soundtracks on Joe Vannelli's DBX label, but it did not chart. Vannelli brought the track to a nightclub in Miami where it was heard by Simon Berry of Platipus Records. Berry worked with Vannelli and James Barton (of Liverpool's Cream nightclub) to release the composition in November 1995 as the lead single from his debut album, Dreamland (1996). "Children" was certified gold and platinum in several countries and reached number one in more than 12 countries; it was Europe's most successful single of 1996.

Background and writing
Miles gave two inspirations for the writing of "Children". One was as a response to photographs of child Yugoslav war victims that his father had brought home from a humanitarian mission in the former Yugoslavia; and the other, inspired by his career as a DJ, was to create a track to end DJ sets, intended to calm rave attendants prior to their driving home as a means to reduce car accident deaths. "Children" cost £150 to record.

"Children" is one of the pioneering tracks of Dream house, a genre of electronic dance music characterized by dream-like piano melodies, and a steady four-on-the-floor bass drum. The creation of dream house was a response to social pressures in Italy during the early 1990s: the growth of rave culture among young adults, and the ensuing popularity of nightclub attendance, had created a weekly trend of deaths due to car accidents as clubbers drove across the country overnight, falling asleep at the wheel from strenuous dancing as well as alcohol and drug use. In mid-1996, deaths due to this phenomenon, called strage del sabato sera (Saturday night slaughter) in Italy, were being estimated at 2000 since the start of the decade. The move by DJs such as Miles to play slower, calming music to conclude a night's set, as a means to counteract the fast-paced, repetitive tracks that preceded, was met with approval by authorities and parents of car crash victims.

Critical reception

Reviews
"Children" received universal acclaim from critics, with many calling the track a masterpiece. AllMusic editor Jose F. Promis described it as "magical". Billboard attributes its widespread success to its melodic nature, characterized by an "instantly recognizable" piano riff (which was not in the track's original version). They identify this factor as making the track accessible to a broader audience beyond clubbers and fans of electronic dance music alone by means of radio airplay. The magazine's Larry Flick noted that Miles "wisely takes his time unraveling his melody, letting it breathe over an urgent, nu-NRG beat and coloring it with twinkling electro effects and vibrant synths. Joyous and invigorating as can be, "Children" deserves to be one of those rare records that never fades beyond recurrent status on any DJ's playlist. We need to hear more from Miles ... and we need to hear it now." Daina Darzin from Cash Box viewed it as "a trancey, dramatic dance track". Dave Sholin from the Gavin Report wrote, "In the time it takes you to listen to this song, another nation has probably taken this remarkable instrumental to the top of their chart. Name a country, and it's likely Number One there right now. And now the music of this classically trained Italian pianist/producer is set to descend on the airwaves and dance floors in the U.S.A. The melody is hypnotic." James Hamilton from Music Week'''s RM Dance Update deemed it a "trancey Italian 'dream music' instrumental". A reviewer from People Magazine called it a "techno-requiem". Synthmania.com, which identifies "Children" as being written on a Kurzweil K2000, calls this the "dream house piano" sound, consisting of "standard piano, syn bass and string/pad sounds bathed in delay and reverb".

Chart performance
"Children" was first released in Italy in January 1995 on Joe T. Vanelli's DBX imprint label, as part of the Soundtracks EP. Subsequently, following exposure at a gathering of DJs and record producers in Miami, the track was licensed by the UK-based Platipus Records who were represented by UK licensing agency Dynamik Music. In conjunction with Miles' manager, Gavin Prunas, the track was licensed to Deconstruction Records; it was then licensed to more than a dozen additional record labels in Europe through DBX, Deconstruction as well as appearing on the Platipus Records Volume 2 compilation released worldwide via Dynamik Music.

"Children" was a success worldwide, peaking at number one in more than 12 countries and holding that position for several weeks. "Children" reached number one in the following countries: Austria (six weeks), Belgium, Denmark, Finland (three weeks), France (11 weeks), Italy, Norway (five weeks), Germany, Scotland (three weeks), Spain, Sweden (seven weeks) and Switzerland (13 weeks); beyond that, according to Billboard magazine, it reached the top five in "every European country that has a singles chart". It spent 13 weeks at number one on the Eurochart Hot 100, reached number two on the UK staying 17 weeks on the chart, and it reached number 21 in the US, holding that position for four weeks. Along with U2 members Adam Clayton and Larry Mullen Jr.'s reworking of the Mission: Impossible theme, it marked the first time since November 1985 that two instrumentals had simultaneously charted in the top 30 of the Billboard Hot 100.

French nightclubs began playing the imported record from Italy in 1995, making France one of the first countries to popularize the track. Spreading through the underground from clubs to, eventually, the radio, it was licensed there by an independent record label in November 1995. Spain and Italy itself were the other early adopters that brought the track into clubs. Club charts in these countries signalled "Children"'s popularity to other countries: In Denmark, club and radio play followed the single's release, while in Belgium radio play only followed by crossing over from club play, and in the Netherlands radio play was the primary factor in the single's promotion. In Germany, a domestic release came after demand built up from club play through promotional releases from the UK and Italy.

In the US, major airplay included pioneering Los Angeles-area dance music station "Groove Radio 103.1," which used "Children" as its first-ever track on 21 June 1996.

In the United Kingdom, BBC Radio 1 did not play "Children" on its daytime playlist at first, though Radio 1 DJ Pete Tong did play it for three weeks in a row on his Essential Selection program in 1996. Tong's appointing it Essential Tune of The Week each week for three weeks in a row culminated in a frenzied bidding war amongst UK major record companies. Meanwhile, Kiss FM was among the first to play it, even using it in one of the station's minute-long television commercials. "Children" reached the number two position on the UK Singles Chart prior to promotion and marketing, and became the year's eighth best-selling single.

Music videosBillboard ascribes the final stage of the composition's promotion to the airing of its accompanying music video on music television networks such as MTV Europe and Germany's VIVA. Two videos were produced, the first was directed by Matt Amos and premiered in November 1995. It features black-and-white footage of a small girl riding in a car through a diverse range of landscape. The locations are London (Piccadilly Circus and Trafalgar Square), Paris (the Eiffel Tower can be seen), Geneva (place du Molard, rue Coutance), Morges (marina with small towers) and countryside in Switzerland (where Miles was born), and France and Italy near the Mont-Blanc Tunnel.

The second video, filmed on location in New York, was directed by Elizabeth Bailey and premiered in February 1996. It was filmed in colour and alternates between images of Miles DJing at a nightclub rave and images of children at play, thereby touching upon both of the themes of the instrumental.

Impact and legacy
Upon including the track on 2002's The Very Best of Euphoria compilation, TheManAdam, co-creator of the Euphoria series of trance DJ mix albums, said that it "had a major influence on [his] generation of remixers and producers when [they] all at first started making trance".

American entertainment company BuzzFeed listed "Children" at number 41 in their list of The 101 Greatest Dance Songs Of the '90s'' in 2017.

Track listings

Charts

Weekly charts

Year-end charts

Certifications

Release history

4 Clubbers version

In 2001, German trance group 4 Clubbers remixed the song and released it as a single. It reached the top 20 in Spain and charted in France, Germany, the Netherlands, and the United Kingdom.

Track listing
 "Children" (Club Radio Edit) – 3:38
 "Children" (FB vs. JJ Radio Edit) – 3:28
 "Children" (Club Mix) – 9:00
 "Children" (Future Breeze vs. Junkfood Junkies Mix) – 7:49

Weekly charts

Jack Holiday and Mike Candys version

In 2012, Jack Holiday and Mike Candys remixed the song and released it as a single.

Track listing
 "Children" (Radio Edit) – 3:07
 "Children" (Christopher S Radio Edit) – 3:08
 "Children" (Original Higher Level Mix) – 5:00
 "Children" (Christopher S Remix) – 5:35
 "Children" (Mike'N'Jack Club Mix) – 4:56
 "Children" (Steam Loco Mix) – 4:57

Weekly charts

See also
 List of number-one dance singles of 1996 (U.S.)

References

External links
 

1990s instrumentals
1995 songs
1995 singles
1996 singles
Arista Records singles
Bertelsmann Music Group singles
Black-and-white music videos
Deconstruction Records singles
European Hot 100 Singles number-one singles
Number-one singles in Austria
Number-one singles in Denmark
Number-one singles in Finland
Number-one singles in Germany
Number-one singles in Iceland
Number-one singles in Italy
Number-one singles in Norway
Number-one singles in Scotland
Number-one singles in Spain
Number-one singles in Sweden
Number-one singles in Switzerland
Robert Miles songs
SNEP Top Singles number-one singles
Songs written by Robert Miles
Trance instrumentals
Ultratop 50 Singles (Wallonia) number-one singles